Louis "Lou" Bullock, Jr. (born May 20, 1976) is an American former professional basketball player.

Although his records have officially been vacated, due to the University of Michigan basketball scandal, his vacated records are unsurpassed for most single-season three-point field goals and career free throws in Michigan Wolverines men's basketball. In 2011, Jon Diebler surpassed his career three point total, for the Big Ten Conference record.

High school
From Maryland, outside of Washington, D.C., Bullock first gained national attention at the now defunct Canterbury Preparatory School (in Accokeek, Maryland) before transferring his senior year to Laurel Baptist. In 1995, he was named Washington Post All Met Basketball Player of the Year, and he averaged 25.7 points, 8.7 rebounds, 8.4 assists and 3.0 steals per game. He was also a McDonald's All-American (where he won the three-point contest) and was widely considered one of the nation's top 30 prospects for that year. The McDonald's All-American three-point contest that Bullock won was brought back to the media when ESPN Classic's "Cheap Seats" re-aired it in an episode depicting the contest, as well as the 2003 NHL Skills competition. He chose the University of Michigan over numerous other schools, including Florida and Maryland.

College career
At Michigan, Bullock would rank third on the school's all-time scoring list with 2,224 points, along with 299 assists, and 137 steals, but all of his and the team's accomplishments while he played have been wiped from the records books because of the University of Michigan basketball scandal in which he and three other Michigan players were given illicit loans by booster Ed Martin. He would be second in Big Ten Conference history in three-point field goals with 339, including a school record 101 in 1996. He also made 86.9% of his free throws during his career.  His 505 free throws made is more than current record holder Cazzie Russell who had 486 but only played three seasons due to freshmen being ineligible during the time he played, or Manny Harris who had 484 but went to the NBA after his junior season. He held the school record for career minutes played until surpassed in 2012 by Zack Novak.

Professional career
Bullock was selected 42nd overall in the 1999 NBA Draft by the NBA club the Minnesota Timberwolves, and he was then traded to the Orlando Magic for cash considerations. He was signed by the Magic for the 1999 preseason, but he was waived before the regular season began and he never played in the NBA. He has played in Europe every season since his graduation from college. He spent three seasons in the Italian League with Müller Verona (1999–01) and with Olimpia Milano (2001–02). Bullock was the leading scorer of the Italian League, in the 2001–02 season, with a scoring average of 24.9 points per game.

He then moved to the Spanish ACB League in 2002, playing three seasons with Unicaja Málaga. In the 2003–04 season, he led the Spanish League in total three-pointers made, making 95 in 34 games. In 2004, Bullock signed with Real Madrid, where he won the Spanish league national championship title in 2005, and he was named the MVP of the league finals. With the Madrid club, he later also won the 2007 Spanish league title, and the 2007 EuroCup title. For the 2010–11 season, he then moved to CB Cajasol Sevilla, where he signed a one-year contract. In April 2012, he then signed with Asefa Estudiantes, until the end of the season.

References

External links
Euroleague.net Profile
Italian League Profile 
Spanish League Profile 
Draftexpress.com Profile
Video Interview With Louis Bullock @ FIBA.com
Louis Bullock NBA Draft Profile @ SportsIllustrated.cnn.com

1976 births
Living people
African-American basketball players
American expatriate basketball people in Italy
American expatriate basketball people in Spain
American men's basketball players
Baloncesto Málaga players
Basketball players from Maryland
Basketball players from Washington, D.C.
CB Estudiantes players
Lega Basket Serie A players
Liga ACB players
McDonald's High School All-Americans
Michigan Wolverines men's basketball players
Minnesota Timberwolves draft picks
Olimpia Milano players
Parade High School All-Americans (boys' basketball)
People from Accokeek, Maryland
Point guards
Real Betis Baloncesto players
Real Madrid Baloncesto players
Scaligera Basket Verona players
Shooting guards
Sportspeople from the Washington metropolitan area
21st-century African-American sportspeople
20th-century African-American sportspeople